Master of Magic is a role-playing video game for the Commodore 64 and ZX Spectrum home computers. It was distributed by Mastertronic in 1985 under its M.A.D. label.

Description
The player controls an unnamed hero who has been dragged into a strange world by Thelric the Master of Magic while exploring caverns. Thelric is looking for an amulet which will provide him with immortality and, having taught the hero a few spells, sets him on a quest to find this artifact.

Music
The music for the Commodore 64 version was written by Rob Hubbard and is an arrangement of the track Shibolet by Synergy (on the album Audion).

Reception
Zzap!64 were impressed by the game, awarding it a score of 88%. Your Sinclair'''s review of the Spectrum version said that it was "a lot of fun to play".

The game also received reviews in contemporary gaming magazines, such as Sinclair User, Crash, ZX Computing, Computer Gamer and MicroHobby''.

References

External links
Master of Magic soundtrack - performed on Analog Synthesizer 
Master of Magic - Solution maps
Master of Magic - further information

Theme music to Master of Magic on YouTube

Role-playing video games
1985 video games
Commodore 64 games
Mastertronic games
ZX Spectrum games
Video games scored by Rob Hubbard
Video games developed in the United Kingdom